Subedar Major Sanjay Kumar PVC (born 3 March 1976) is a Junior Commissioned Officer in the Indian Army, and recipient of the Param Vir Chakra, India's highest military award.

Early life
Sanjay Kumar was born in village Kalol Bakain in Bilaspur District of Himachal Pradesh. Prior to joining the army, he worked as a taxi driver in New Delhi. His application was rejected three times before he was finally selected to join  the army.

Military career
On 4 July 1999, as a member of the 13th Battalion, Jammu & Kashmir Rifles, he was the leading scout of a team tasked to capturing Area Flat Top, during the Kargil War. The area was held by Pakistani troops. Having scaled the cliff, the team was pinned down by machine gun fire from an enemy bunker, about 150 meters away.

Kumar, realizing the magnitude of the problem and the detrimental effect this bunker would have in the capture of Area Flat Top, crawled alone up the ledge, along a flank, and charged towards the enemy bunker through a hail of automatic fire. Almost instantly he took two bullets in his chest and forearm that left him bleeding profusely.

Though bleeding from the bullet wounds, he continued the charge towards the bunker. In hand-to-hand fighting, he killed three enemy soldiers.  He then picked up an enemy machine gun and crept towards the second enemy bunker. The enemy soldiers, taken completely by surprise, were killed by him as they fled their post. Inspired by his act the rest of the platoon charged, assaulted the feature and captured Area Flat Top.

In February 2022, he received the rank of Subedar Major and is posted to the  National Defence Academy in Khadakwasla near Pune.

Param Vir Chakra
The Param Vir Chakra citation on the official Indian Army website reads as follows:

Awards and decorations
During his career, he has been awarded with the Param Vir Chakra (Independence Day 1999) for his part in the Operation Vijay.

Controversy
In 2010 Kumar was demoted from the rank of Havildar to Lance Naik. The army refused to cite any reasons for his demotion. Moreover, the army concealed the facts and by continuing to refer to him as Havildar in press releases. Recipients of the Param-Vir Chakra are saluted irrespective of rank, which is alleged to be the bone of contention between Kumar and senior officers.

Kumar was offered a job by the Himachal Pradesh Government and may accept this offer after completing his 15 years of service (for receiving post-retirement benefits) in the army.

On 2 July 2014, Kumar became a Junior Commissioned Officer (JCO) of the Indian Army, with his promotion to Naib Subedar. While the promotion of Kumar had once become an issue in the Army after he was allegedly demoted to the rank of Lance Naik from the rank of Havildar in 2008, the issue was later buried with the intervention of higher authorities. It was also stated that there are no out-of-turn promotions for recipients of gallantry awards in the Army and they are promoted as per their seniority with their fellow soldiers in the unit.

He was promoted to the rank of Subedar Major in February 2022.

In popular culture
Kumar's story along with others who were part of the same conflict was portrayed in the film LOC Kargil, in which his character was played by famous Bollywood actor Sunil Shetty.

Notes

References

1976 births
Indian Army personnel
Recipients of the Param Vir Chakra
Living people
People from Bilaspur, Himachal Pradesh
Military personnel from Himachal Pradesh
Indian taxi drivers